Makikihi is a small town in the Waimate District of south Canterbury region of New Zealand's South Island. It is located on State Highway 1 12.2 kilometres south of Saint Andrews, Canterbury, and 15.5 kilometres northeast of Waimate. It is close to the mouth of Makikihi River.

Demographics
The settlement is part of the larger Makikihi-Willowbridge statistical area.

Mākikihi had a population of 84 at the 2018 New Zealand census, an increase of 12 people (16.7%) since the 2013 census, and an increase of 12 people (16.7%) since the 2006 census. There were 30 households. There were 45 males and 36 females, giving a sex ratio of 1.25 males per female. The median age was 47.7 years (compared with 37.4 years nationally), with 9 people (10.7%) aged under 15 years, 12 (14.3%) aged 15 to 29, 39 (46.4%) aged 30 to 64, and 21 (25.0%) aged 65 or older.

Ethnicities were 85.7% European/Pākehā, 10.7% Māori, 3.6% Pacific peoples, and 10.7% other ethnicities (totals add to more than 100% since people could identify with multiple ethnicities).

Although some people objected to giving their religion, 50.0% had no religion, and 32.1% were Christian.

Of those at least 15 years old, 3 (4.0%) people had a bachelor or higher degree, and 21 (28.0%) people had no formal qualifications. The median income was $21,400, compared with $31,800 nationally. The employment status of those at least 15 was that 36 (48.0%) people were employed full-time, 9 (12.0%) were part-time, and 3 (4.0%) were unemployed.

Makikihi-Willowbridge statistical area
The Makikihi-Willowbridge statistical area includes Hook and Studholme, and extends to Waimate but does not include it.

Makikihi-Willowbridge had a population of 1,008 at the 2018 New Zealand census, an increase of 15 people (1.5%) since the 2013 census, and an increase of 24 people (2.4%) since the 2006 census. There were 396 households. There were 543 males and 465 females, giving a sex ratio of 1.17 males per female. The median age was 46.5 years (compared with 37.4 years nationally), with 171 people (17.0%) aged under 15 years, 150 (14.9%) aged 15 to 29, 498 (49.4%) aged 30 to 64, and 189 (18.8%) aged 65 or older.

Ethnicities were 89.9% European/Pākehā, 6.8% Māori, 1.5% Pacific peoples, 5.1% Asian, and 1.8% other ethnicities (totals add to more than 100% since people could identify with multiple ethnicities).

The proportion of people born overseas was 16.4%, compared with 27.1% nationally.

Although some people objected to giving their religion, 49.1% had no religion, 41.4% were Christian, 0.3% were Buddhist and 0.6% had other religions.

Of those at least 15 years old, 99 (11.8%) people had a bachelor or higher degree, and 198 (23.7%) people had no formal qualifications. The median income was $31,800, compared with $31,800 nationally. 138 people (16.5%) earned over $70,000 compared to 17.2% nationally. The employment status of those at least 15 was that 450 (53.8%) people were employed full-time, 144 (17.2%) were part-time, and 21 (2.5%) were unemployed.

Education 
Makikihi School is a full primary school serving years 1 to 8, with a roll of  students as of  The school opened in 1881.

References

Waimate District
Populated places in Canterbury, New Zealand